Carmen Rizzo (born April 8, 1964) is an American record producer, mixer, programmer, DJ, remixer and recording artist, based in Los Angeles. The two-time Grammy nominee has worked with Seal, Coldplay, Paul Oakenfold, Alanis Morissette, Dido, Jem, Niyaz, Ryuichi Sakamoto, Khaled, Tiësto, BT, Esthero, A.R. Rahman and Pete Townshend.

Spanning a record-making career of nearly two decades, Rizzo has worked with record producers Trevor Horn, David Foster, Marius De Vries and Rob Cavallo. In addition to collaborating with Tuvan throat singers Huun Huur Tu, Rizzo also co-founded the world/electronic act Niyaz with Azam Ali and Loga Ramin Torkian (with three #1 iTunes albums), and contributed original music to the David Lynch Foundation album alongside Moby and Peter Gabriel. Rizzo has released his own solo electronic albums: Lost Art of the Idle Moment (2005), Ornament of an Imposter (2008), and Looking Through Leaves (2010), with invited musicians and vocalists as contributors and The Space Left Behind. Rizzo's music also appears in numerous movies and TV shows including CSI Miami and True Blood.

Rizzo is a member of the National Academy of Recording Arts and Sciences, and served on the board of Governors & Trustees (Grammy) as well as on the Producer & Engineering Advisory Board. In these roles Rizzo was partly responsible for introducing the category of Best Electronic Album.
Rizzo participated in and hosted the HBO documentary, The Song Story, which documents three unsigned music artists produced by him.

As a composer, Rizzo is represented by the William Morris Agency. In addition to scoring films for director Michael Apted, he composed the score for the film Perfect Sisters with Oscar-nominated actress Abigail Breslin and Oscar-winner Mira Sorvino, as well as the end title for the video game, Uncharted 2. Rizzo is represented by Global Positioning Services in Santa Monica, California.

Selected discography

References

External links
Official website

1964 births
Living people
Record producers from Ohio
Songwriters from Ohio
Businesspeople from Akron, Ohio
American film score composers
American audio engineers
Mixing engineers